The 2016 UCI Africa Tour was the 12th season of the UCI Africa Tour. The season began on 18 January with the La Tropicale Amissa Bongo and ended on 16 October with the Grand Prix Chantal Biya.

The points leader, based on the cumulative results of previous races, wears the UCI Africa Tour cycling jersey. Salah Eddine Mraouni (289 points) of Morocco is the defending champion of the 2015 UCI Africa Tour.

Throughout the season, points are awarded to the top finishers of stages within stage races and the final general classification standings of each of the stages races and one-day events. The quality and complexity of a race also determines how many points are awarded to the top finishers, the higher the UCI rating of a race, the more points are awarded.
The UCI ratings from highest to lowest are as follows:
 Multi-day events: 2.HC, 2.1 and 2.2
 One-day events: 1.HC, 1.1 and 1.2

Events

Final standings

Individual classification

Teams classification

Nations classification

External links
 

UCI Africa Tour
UCI Africa Tour
UCI Africa Tour